Noyna Hill (sometimes just called "Noyna" or "Noyna Rock/s") is a hill in the Pennines hills range in Pendle, Lancashire, England.

It is located a mile to the east of Foulridge and it is possible to see other local towns such as Colne, Nelson, Trawden, Barnoldswick and Earby. On a clear day most of Lancashire and the Yorkshire Dales are seen from here.

Although the prominence is not that great due to the close proximity of other hills, it is unique in the area for having a large wide, but not very high rocky outcrop that is distinctive and well known in the area. The hill is 122m, (400 ft) above the village of Foulridge.

The hill is on farmland, but has public footpaths that allow access.

References

External links
 About Foulridge
 Foulridge Parish Council - with photos
 BBC Sunday stroll in Foulridge & Noyna
 Photos of the area
 The Noyna Walk
 Article about local rocky outcrops on hills

Geography of the Borough of Pendle
Mountains and hills of Lancashire